Edera or Edera River Awyu is a Papuan language of Papua, Indonesia, spoken along the Edera River. It is closely related to Kia River Awyu.

References

Languages of western New Guinea
Awyu–Dumut languages